The Dead Leaves (formerly "Matt Joe Gow and The Dead Leaves") is an Australian alternative rock band formed in 2009. Their line up consists of vocalist/guitarist Matt Joe Gow, guitarist Andrew Pollock, bassist Cameron Grindrod, keyboardist Clio Renner and drummer Joel Witenberg. The band is based in Melbourne, Australia, although Joe Gow is from New Zealand.

The group initially formed to serve as a backing band on Matt Joe Gow's solo album The Messenger, released through Liberation Music in July 2009. Produced by Nash Chambers, the album features instrumental contributions from Jim Moginie and Bill Chambers. The first single off the album, "Come What May" received some international airplay. The Messenger is, however, considered by the band as predominantly a solo work.

The group's 2012 album Cities on the Sea (released in February 2012, produced by Scott Horscroft and Eric J Dubowsky) was regarded as their first official album. The album marks a change in direction from the solo material and features guest vocals from Emma Louise and Gin Wigmore.

In 2014 the band entered an indefinite hiatus with Matt Joe Gow focusing on his solo work alongside Pollock, Clio Renner also focusing on her solo work and Joel Witenberg forming New York based indie band 'Surf Rock Is Dead'.

References

Sources 
 http://www.noisey.vice.com/en_ca/article/rmjjnx/get-lazy-with-surf-rock-is-deads-late-risers
 http://www.wptsradio.org/we-have-no-friends-ep-by-surf-rock-is-dead-review/
 http://www.soundsofoz.com/2016/09/23/seven-years-matt-joe-gow/
 http://www.fortemag.com.au/?p=41931
 http://www.odt.co.nz/entertainment/music/music-review-matt-joe-gow

External links
 Official website
 Facebook

Australian indie rock groups